Millinocket School Department is a school district headquartered in Millinocket, Maine. Its schools are Granite Street School and Stearns Junior-Senior High School.

In April 2012, due to decreasing enrollment in the high school, the district superintendent, Ken Smith, made efforts to recruit international students from China.

References

External links
 Millinocket School Department

School districts in Maine
Education in Penobscot County, Maine
Millinocket, Maine